Raymond Lester Pierce (June 6, 1897 – May 4, 1963) was an American baseball player who played pitcher in the Major Leagues from 1924 to 1926.  He played for the Chicago Cubs and Philadelphia Phillies.

References

1897 births
1963 deaths
Major League Baseball pitchers
Chicago Cubs players
Philadelphia Phillies players
Baseball players from Kansas
People from Emporia, Kansas